Murder is the fourth full-length album by the Norwegian black metal band Gehenna.

Track listing
"Intro" - 1:13
"Murder" - 2:46
"Worthy Exit" - 3:06
"Devout Dementia" - 4:12
"The Crucified One" - 3:27
"Perfect Hate" - 5:04
"To the Grave" - 2:42
"Trail of Blood" - 2:30
"Master Satan" - 3:23
"The Dead" - 3:17

Credits 
Sanrabb - Guitar, Vocals & Synth
Dolgar - Guitar & Vocals
E.N. Death - Bass
Blod - Drums & Percussion

Additional Credits 
Ole "Nekro" Egeli - Additional guitar on "The Crucified One", "Murder" and "Master Satan"

References 

2000 albums
Gehenna (band) albums